Nene Tomita (Tomita Nene), born September 30, 1982 is a former volleyball player who played for Toray Arrows.

Profiles 
Her parents were the basketball players in China. When she was baby her father died, and her mother took her to Japan. Her mother remarried with a Japanese husband, so her nationality is not Chinese but Japanese.

When she was in the 6th grade she was featured in a TV show on the tallest Japanese young girls. She was 177 cm. When asked how tall would she like to be, her reply was 185 cm. She retired from the Toray Arrows in May 2008.

Clubs 
 Furukawa commercial high school
 Hitachi(2001)
 Toray Arrows(2001–2008)

Awards

Individual 
2001 8th V.League New face award

Team 
2002 Kurowashiki All Japan Volleyball Championship -  Champion, with Toray Arrows.
2004 Kurowashiki All Japan Volleyball Championship -  Champion, with Toray Arrows.
2007 Domestic Sports Festival (Volleyball) -  Champion, with Toray Arrows.
2007-2008 Empress's Cup -   Champion, with Toray Arrows.
2007-2008 V.Premier League -  Champion, with Toray Arrows.

References

1982 births
Living people
Japanese women's volleyball players
Japanese sportspeople of Chinese descent